The Jackson House is a historic house at 125 Jackson Street in Newton, Massachusetts.  The -story timber-frame house was built either c. 1768 or c. 1782, and is one of Newton's few surviving 18th-century farmhouses.  A house is known to have been on the property c. 1768, but the present house use construction methods and styling more common to a later period in the 18th century, suggesting a c. 1782 construction date.  It was restyled in the 1850s to give it Greek Revival features.

The house was listed on the National Register of Historic Places in 1986.

See also
 National Register of Historic Places listings in Newton, Massachusetts

References

Houses on the National Register of Historic Places in Newton, Massachusetts
Georgian architecture in Massachusetts
Houses completed in 1768
1768 establishments in Massachusetts